Di-deuterated ethyl linoleate (also known as RT001, di-deuterated linoleic acid ethyl ester, 11,11-d2-ethyl linoleate, or ethyl 11,11-d2-linoleate) is an experimental, orally-bioavailable synthetic deuterated polyunsaturated fatty acid (PUFA), a part of reinforced lipids.  It is an isotopologue of linoleic acid, an essential omega-6 PUFA. The deuterated compound, while identical to natural linoleic acid except for the presence of deuterium, is resistant to lipid peroxidation which makes studies of its cell-protective properties worthwhile.

Mechanism of action

Di-deuterated linoleic acid is recognized by cells as identical to the natural linoleic acid. But when taken up, it is converted into 13,13-d2-arachidonic acid, a heavy isotope version of arachidonic acid, that gets incorporated into lipid membranes. The deuterated compound resists the non-enzymatic lipid peroxidation (LPO) through isotope effect — a non-antioxidant based mechanism that protects mitochondrial, neuronal and other lipid membranes, thereby greatly reducing the levels of numerous LPO-derived toxic products such as reactive carbonyls.

Clinical development

Friedreich's ataxia 
A double-blind comparator-controlled Phase I/II clinical trial for Friedreich's ataxia, sponsored by Retrotope and Friedreich's Ataxia Research Alliance, was conducted to determine the safety profile and appropriate dosing for consequent trials. RT001 was promptly absorbed and was found to be safe and tolerable over 28 days at the maximal dose of 9 g/day. It improved peak workload and peak oxygen consumption in the test group compared to the control group who received the equal doses of normal, non-deuterated ethyl linoleate. Another randomised, double-blind, placebo-controlled clinical study began in 2019.

Infantile neuroaxonal dystrophy 
An open-label clinical study for infantile neuroaxonal dystrophy evaluating long-term evaluation of efficacy, safety, tolerability, and pharmacokinetics of RT001, which, when taken with food, can protect the neuronal cells from degeneration, started in the Summer 2018.

Phospholipase 2G6-associated neurodegeneration 
In 2017, the FDA granted RT001 orphan drug designation in the treatment of phospholipase 2G6-associated neurodegeneration (PLAN).

Amyotrophic lateral sclerosis  
In 2018, RT001 was given to a patient with amyotrophic lateral sclerosis (ALS) under a "compassionate use scheme".

Progressive supranuclear palsy 
In 2020, the FDA granted orphan drug designation RT001 for the treatment of patients with progressive supranuclear palsy (PSP). PSP is a disease involving modification and dysfunction of tau protein; RT001’s mechanism of action both lowers lipid peroxidation and prevents mitochondrial cell death of neurons which is associated with disease onset and progression.

Preclinical research

Alzheimer's disease 
RT001 has been shown to be effective in a model of Alzheimer's disease in mice.

References 

Biochemistry
Ethyl esters
Fatty acid esters
Deuterated compounds